A kitchen knife is any knife that is intended to be used in food preparation. While much of this work can be accomplished with a few general-purpose knives – notably a large chef's knife, a tough cleaver, a small paring knife and some sort of serrated blade (such as a bread knife or serrated utility knife) – there are also many specialized knives that are designed for specific tasks. Kitchen knives can be made from several different materials.

Construction

Material

 Carbon steel is an alloy of iron and carbon, often including other elements such as vanadium and manganese. Carbon steel commonly used in knives has around 1.0% carbon (ex. AISI 1095), is inexpensive, and holds its edge well. Carbon steel is normally easier to resharpen than many stainless steels, but is vulnerable to rust and stains. The blades should be cleaned, dried, and lubricated after each use. New carbon-steel knives may impart a metallic or "iron" flavour to acidic foods, though over time, the steel will acquire a patina of oxidation which will prevent corrosion. Good carbon steel will take a sharp edge, but is not so hard as to be difficult to sharpen, unlike some grades of stainless steel.

 Stainless steel is an alloy of iron, approximately 10–15% chromium, possibly nickel, and molybdenum, with only a small amount of carbon.  Typical stainless steel knives are made of 420 stainless, a high-chromium stainless steel alloy often used in flatware. Stainless steel may be softer than carbon steel, but this makes it easier to sharpen. Stainless steel knives resist rust and corrosion better than carbon steel knives. 

 High carbon stainless steel is a stainless steel alloy with a relatively high amount of carbon compared to other stainless alloys. For example, AISI grade 420 stainless steel normally contains 0.15% by weight of carbon, but the 420HC variant used for cutlery has 0.4% to 0.5%. The increased carbon content is intended to provide the best attributes of carbon steel and ordinary stainless steel. High carbon stainless steel blades do not discolour or stain, and maintain a sharp edge for a reasonable time. Most 'high-carbon' stainless blades are made of more expensive alloys than less-expensive stainless knives, often including amounts of molybdenum, vanadium, cobalt, and other components intended to increase strength, edge-holding, and cutting ability. 

 Laminated blades combine the advantages of a hard, but brittle steel which will hold a good edge but is easily chipped and damaged, with a tougher steel less susceptible to damage and chipping, but incapable of taking a good edge. The hard steel is sandwiched (laminated) and protected between layers of the tougher steel. The hard steel forms the edge of the knife; it will take a more acute grind than a softer steel, and will stay sharp longer.

 Titanium is lighter and more corrosion-resistant, but not harder than steel. However it is more flexible than steel. Titanium does not impart any flavour to food. It is typically expensive and not well suited to cutlery.

 Ceramic knives are very hard, made from sintered zirconium dioxide, and retain their sharp edge for a long time. They are light in weight, do not impart any taste to food and do not corrode. Suitable for slicing fruit, vegetables and boneless meat. Ceramic knives are best used as a specialist kitchen utensil. Recent manufacturing improvements have made them less brittle. Because of their hardness and brittle edges, sharpening requires special techniques. 

 Plastic blades are usually not very sharp and are mainly used to cut through vegetables without causing discolouration. They are not sharp enough to cut deeply into flesh, but can cut or scratch skin.

Blade manufacturing
Steel blades can be manufactured either by being forged or stamped.
 Hand forged blades are made in a multi-step process by skilled manual labor. A chunk of steel alloy is heated to a high temperature, and pounded while hot to form it. The blade is then heated above critical temperature (which varies between alloys), quenched in an appropriate liquid, and tempered to the desired hardness. Commercially, "forged" blades may receive as little as one blow from a hammer between dies, to form features such as the "bolster" in a blank. After forging and heat-treating, the blade is polished and sharpened. Forged blades are typically thicker and heavier than stamped blades, which is sometimes advantageous.
 Stamped blades are cut to shape directly from cold-rolled steel, heat-treated for strength, then ground, polished, and sharpened. Stamped blades can often, but not always, be identified by the absence of a bolster.

Type of edge
The edge of the knife can be sharpened to a cutting surface in a number of different ways. There are three main features:
 the grind – what a cross-section looks like
 the profile – whether the edge is straight or serrated, and straight, curved or recurved
 away from edge – how the blade is constructed away from the edge

Grind

Profile

Kitchen knives generally either feature a curve near the tip, as in a chef's knife, or are straight for their entire length. The edge itself may be generally smooth (a "straight" or "clean" edge), or may be serrated or scalloped (have "teeth") in some way.

 Serrated blade knives have a wavy, scalloped or saw-like blade. Serrations help when cutting things that are hard on the outside and soft on the inside (such as bread or tomatoes); the saw-like action breaks the surface more easily than anything except the very sharpest smooth blade. They are also particularly good on fibrous foods such as celery or cabbage. Serrated knives cut much better than plain-edge blade knives when dull, so they do not require frequent sharpening (some serrated blades are claimed never to need sharpening), and are sometimes used to make steak knives which do not need frequent sharpening. However, they are not readily sharpened properly by a user, requiring specialized equipment, and may never be resharpened during their useful life. Serrations are often used to improve the cutting ability of a less-expensive blade not capable of taking and keeping a sharp edge, usually having a thin, polished blade designed to minimise friction. A serrated knife is more practical for a user who is not prepared to sharpen it frequently; a well-maintained and sharpened smooth edge is keener.
Some companies have names for their own serration patterns and apply them to an entire line of knives. Examples are Cutco's Double-D edge and Henckel's Eversharp Pro series.

Indentations

Away from the edge, a knife most simply has either a rectangular or wedge-shaped cross-section (saber grind vs. flat grind), but may also have indentations, whose purpose is to reduce adhesion of the food to the blade. This is widely found in Japanese knives, and in the West is particularly found in meat carving knives, though also in knives for soft cheese, and some use for vegetables.

These indentations take many forms:

 Granton knives have semi-circular scallops ground into the edge that alternate on either side of the knife and extend from the edge to the middle of the blade. This design was developed and patented in 1928 by William Grant & Sons Ltd. A similar design, kullenschliff (kulle is Swedish for hill (or -more likely- a misspelling of the German word "Kuhle" meaning "hollow" or "deepening"); schliff meaning "cut" or grind in German), has oval scallops (kuhlen)  hollowed-out of one or both sides of the blade above the edge. The Granton design is normally found on meat carving knives but have recently appeared on other types of knives, especially Western variations of the Japanese santoku. The indentations require a certain thickness, so they are more frequently used on thicker, softer blades, rather than on thin, hard ones. The design of scallop-sided blades is an attempt to ease the cutting and separation of meats, cheese, and vegetables.

 Urasuki is a common feature of Japanese kitchen knives. While Japanese kitchen knives initially appear as a simple chisel grind (flat on the side facing the food, angled on the other), the apparently flat side is subtly concave, to reduce adhesion, and, further, the apparent chisel cut of the edge is actually a small bevel, as otherwise the edge would be weakened by the concave area above.

 Holes may also be found in a blade, to reduce adhesion still further. These are most found in knives for soft cheese, which is particularly soft and sticky.

Sharpening

The edge of a knife gradually loses its sharpness, which can be restored by sharpening. For many types of knives (e.g., butter knives) this is not relevant. Knives with smooth edges can be sharpened by the user; knives with any form of serrated edge should ideally be sharpened with specialist equipment, although the useful life of a serrated knife can be extended by simple sharpeners, even if they damage the edge.

Handle
The handles of kitchen knives can be made from a number of different materials, each of which has advantages and disadvantages.
 Wood handles provide good grip, and most people consider them to be the most attractive.  They are, however, slightly more difficult to care for as they must be cleaned more thoroughly and occasionally treated with mineral oil. Most wood handles, especially those of ordinary varnished hardwood, do not resist water well, and will crack or warp with prolonged exposure to water. They should be hand-washed for that reason.
 Plastic handles are more easily cared for than wooden handles and do not absorb microorganisms. However, plastics may also be less resistant to ultraviolet damage and may become brittle over time, resulting in cracking. Some plastics are also slippery in the hand. The material is lighter than most other materials, which may result in a knife that is off-balance or too light for some tastes.
 Composite "pakka wood" knives are made from laminated wood composites impregnated with plastic resin. Composite handles are considered by many chefs to be the best choice because they are as easy to care for and as sanitary as plastic, they have the appearance, weight, and grip of hardwood, and are more durable than either. They often have a laminated, polished appearance, and may have intense or varied coloring.
 Stainless steel handles are the most durable of all handles, as well as the most sanitary.  Many argue, however, that they are very slippery in the hand, especially when wet. To counter this, many premium knife makers make handles with ridges, bumps, or indentations to provide extra grip. One disadvantage of some all-metal handles is that knife weight usually goes up considerably, affecting the knife's balance and increasing hand and wrist fatigue. Knife manufacturers, most notably Japan's Global, have begun addressing this issue by producing hollow-handled knives.

Nomenclature

Common kitchen knives

Chef's knife

Also known as a cook's knife or French knife, the chef's knife is an all-purpose knife that is curved to allow the cook to rock the knife on the cutting board for a more precise cut. The broad and heavy blade also serves for chopping bone instead of the cleaver, making this knife the all purpose heavy knife for food preparation. Chef's knives are most commonly available between 15 cm and 30 cm (6 and 12 inches), though 20 cm (8 inches) is the most common size.

Paring
A paring knife or parer is a small all-purpose knife with a plain edge that is ideal for peeling (or "paring") fruits and vegetables, and other small or intricate work (such as de-veining a shrimp, removing the seeds from a jalapeño, 'skinning' or cutting small garnishes). Paring knives are usually 6 to 10 cm ( to 4 inches) long. An alternative way to peel vegetables and fruit is to use a peeler.

16th century French bookbinders used a tool also known as a paring knife (couteau à parer) to thin the edges of the leather binding being prepared to cover a book in order to ensure it was neater and stuck better to the board. The knife was a large piece of steel, very thin at the cutting edge, with a wooden handle.

Utility
In kitchen usage, a utility knife falls between a chef's knife and a paring knife in size, some 10 cm to 18 cm (4 to 7 inches) in length.

Outside a kitchen, the term "utility knife" refers to a cutting tool with a short blade which can be replaced, or with a strip of blades which can be snapped off when worn.

Bread knife

Serrated knives are able to cut soft bread without crushing it; one was exhibited at the World's Columbian Exposition in 1893 in Chicago by the Friedrich Dick company (Esslingen, Germany).  One design was patented in the United States by Joseph E. Burns of Syracuse, New York. His knife had sections of grooves or serrations, inclined with respect to the axis of the blade, that form individual small cutting edges which were perpendicular to the blade and thus cut without the excessive normal pressure required of a scalloped blade and without the horizontal force required by positive-raked teeth that would dig into the bread like a wood saw. There were also sections of grooves with the opposite direction of inclination, separated by a section of smooth blade, and the knife thus cut cleanly in both directions in both hard and soft bread.

Bread knives are usually between 15 cm and 25 cm (6 and 10 inches).

An offset bread knife 'doglegs' the handle above but parallel to the blade (rather than inline with it, although some are angled), providing clearance for the user's knuckles. This design makes it easier for the user to cut fully through the loaf without using an awkward grip, angling and 'see-sawing' the blade, or needing to position the knife handle over the edge of the counter or cutting board. While fairly specialized and unnecessary for most kitchens (and breads), the offset design is well-suited for high-volume/'production' work where much bread - particularly e.g. crusty loaves of baguette-type bread - is cut regularly and/or over long periods, to reduce fatigue.  An alternative seen mostly in Europe is a baguette "chopper" or "guillotine" - not properly a knife, and prone to produce more of a "crushing" cut depending on the bread - but serving the same function.

Butter knife

Butter knives have a dull cutting edge and are generally used for spreading. They are typically thought of more as servingware (used more as part of a table setting), to be used by diners to serve and/or spread butter or other soft spreadable foods, i.e. soft cheeses or jams, than as a kitchen or food preparation tool.

A modern variant that is intended for food prep is the 'sandwich spreader' - a broad, flexible, almost spatula-like tool, with a rounded end and often with one serrated edge, similar to that used by pastry chefs to ice cakes. This is useful for spreading butter, mayonnaise/mustard, other similar 'spreads' or dressings, sandwich 'salad' toppings like egg salad, chicken salad, ham spread, etc., on bread.

Meat knives

Carving

A carving knife is a large knife (between 20 cm and 38 cm (8 and 15 inches)) that is used to slice thin cuts of meat, including poultry, roasts, hams, and other large cooked meats. A carving knife is much thinner than a chef's knife (particularly at the spine), enabling it to carve thinner, more precise slices.

Slicing
A slicing knife serves a similar function to a carving knife, although it is generally longer and narrower. Slicers may have plain or serrated edges. Such knives often incorporate blunted or rounded tips, and feature kullenschliff (Swedish/German: "hill-sharpened") or Granton edge (scalloped blades) to improve meat separation. Slicers are designed to precisely cut smaller and thinner slices of meat, and are normally more flexible to accomplish this task. As such, many cooks find them better suited to slicing ham, roasts, fish, or barbecued beef and pork and venison.

Ham slicer

A ham slicer is a special type of slicer, with a long blade and rounded tip, that is offered by some manufacturers. The average size of the knife is between 9 and 15 inches. They are specially tailored to cutting ham, as they are generally thinner and more flexible. Another use can be for bigger fruit, like watermelon or cantaloupe.

Cleaver

A meat cleaver is a large, most often rectangular knife that is used for splitting or "cleaving" meat and bone. A cleaver may be distinguished from a kitchen knife of similar shape by the fact that it has a heavy blade that is thick from the spine to quite near the edge. The edge is sharply beveled and the bevel is typically convex. The knife is designed to cut with a swift stroke without cracking, splintering or bending the blade. Many cleavers have a hole in the end to allow them to be easily hung on a rack. Cleavers are an essential tool for any restaurant that prepares its own meat. The cleaver most often found in a home knife set is a light-duty cleaver about 6 in (15 cm) long. Heavy cleavers with much thicker blades are often found in the trade.

A "lobster splitter" is a light-duty cleaver used mainly for shellfish and fowl which has the profile of a chef's knife. The Chinese chef's knife is sometimes called a "Chinese cleaver", due to the rectangular blade, but it is unsuitable for cleaving, its thin blade instead designed for slicing; actual Chinese cleavers are heavier and similar to Western cleavers.

A cleaver is most popularly known as butcher knife which is the commonly used by chefs for cutting big slices of meat and poultry.

Boning

A boning knife is used to remove bones from cuts of meat. It has a thin, flexible blade, usually about 12 cm to 15 cm (5 or 6 inches) long, that allows it to get in to small spaces. A stiff boning knife is good for beef and pork, and a flexible one is preferred for poultry and fish.

Fillet

Fillet knives are like very flexible boning knives that are used to fillet and prepare fish. They have blades about 15 cm to 28 cm (6 to 11 inches) long, allowing them to move easily along the backbone and under the skin of fish.

Steak knife

A steak knife is a sharp table knife designed to efficiently and effectively cut steak. This type of knife comes in a variety of styles and sizes; however, the design often used in a steakhouse typically features a partially serrated blade and wood handle.

Cheese knives 

Cheese is varied and often challenging to cut. Accordingly, various styles of cheese knives and cheese cutting utensils have been developed. A wire, rather than a knife, is often used to cut cheese.

Soft cheese
Soft cheese knives are specially designed for slicing soft cheese. They generally have holes in the blade to prevent the cheese from sticking. Wire cheese cutters are also used.

Hard cheese
Hard cheese knives are specially designed for slicing hard cheese. They are sharp, so they can cut exact slices, and often have a forked tip, allowing them to be used as a serving utensil as well. Cheese slicers are also used.

Parmesan cheese

Parmesan cheese knives are specially designed for portioning very hard cheeses. They have very short, thick blades that are forced into the cheese and then used as a lever to break off smaller portions. (Slicing hard cheese is considered improper by connoisseurs, since the cheese—when broken apart—has more surface area, and thus more air contact, which strengthens the apparent scent and taste of the cheese.)

By country

Japanese knives

Santoku

The Santoku has a straighter edge than a chef's knife, with a blunted sheepsfoot-tip blade and a thinner spine, particularly near the point. From 12 cm to 18 cm (5 to 7 inches) long, a Japanese Santoku is well-balanced, normally flat-ground, and generally lighter and thinner than its Western counterparts.  This construction allows the knife to more easily slice thin-boned and boneless meats, fish, and vegetables. Many subsequent Western and Asian copies of the Japanese Santoku do not always incorporate these features, resulting in reduced cutting ability. Some Western Santoku-pattern knives are even fitted with kullen/kuhlen, scallops on the sides of the blade above the edge, in an attempt to reduce the sticking of foods and reduce cutting friction.  A standard in Asian (especially Japanese) kitchens, the santoku and its Western copies have become very popular in recent years with chefs in Europe and the United States.

Sashimi bōchō

 

Tako hiki, yanagi ba, and fugu hiki are long thin knives used in the Japanese kitchen, belonging to the group of Sashimi bōchō to prepare sashimi, sliced raw fish and seafood.

Similar to the nakiri bocho, the style differs slightly between Tokyo and Osaka. In Osaka, the yanagi ba has a pointed end, whereas in Tokyo the tako hiki has a rectangular end. The tako hiki is usually used to prepare octopus. A fugu hiki is similar to the yanagi ba, except that the blade is thinner. As the name indicates, the fugu hiki is traditionally used to slice very thin fugu sashimi.

The length of the knife is suitable to fillet medium-sized fish. For very large fish such as tuna, longer specialized knives exist, for example the almost two-meter long oroshi hocho, or the slightly shorter hancho hocho.

Nakiri bōchō

Nakiri bocho and usuba bocho are Japanese-style vegetable knives. They differ from the deba bocho in their shape, as they have a straight blade edge suitable for cutting all the way to the cutting board without the need for a horizontal pull or push. These knives are also much thinner. While the deba bocho is a heavy blade for easy cutting through thin bones, the blade is not suitable for chopping vegetables, as the thicker blade can break the vegetable slice. The nakiri bocho and the usuba bocho have much thinner blades, and are used for cutting vegetables.

Nakiri bocho are knives for home use, and usually have a black blade. The shape of the nakiri bocho differs according to the region of origin, with knives in the Tokyo area being rectangular in shape, whereas the knives in the Osaka area have a rounded corner on the far blunt side. The cutting edge is angled from both sides, called ryoba in Japanese. This makes it easier to cut straight slices.

Usuba bocho are vegetable knives used by professionals. They differ from the Nakiri bocho in the shape of the cutting edge. While the nakiri bocho is sharpened from both sides, the usuba bocho is sharpened only from one side, a style known as kataba in Japanese. The highest quality kataba blades even have a slight depression on the flat side. This kataba style edge gives better cuts and allows for the cutting of thinner slices than the ryoba used for nakiri bocho, but requires more skill to use. The sharpened side is usually the right side for a right hand use of the knife, but knives sharpened on the left side are also available for left hand use. The usuba bocho is also slightly heavier than a nakiri bocho, although still much lighter than a deba bocho.

Usuba bōchō

Usuba knives are Japanese knives used primarily for chopping vegetables. Both the spine and edge are straight, making them resemble cleavers, though they are much lighter.

Deba bōchō

Deba knives are Japanese knives used primarily for cutting fish. They have blades that are 18 cm to 30 cm (7 to 12 inches) long with a curved spine.

Chinese chef's knife

A Chinese chef's knife—sometimes referred to as a càidāo (which literally means "vegetable knife"), a Chinese cleaver or a "chopper", is the rectangular-bladed, all-purpose cooking knife traditionally used in China, Vietnam, Cambodia and many other Asian countries to prepare a variety of meats, fish and vegetables.  The popularity of this style of knife has spread with the associated cuisines.  They resemble Western cleavers in appearance, but most Chinese chef's knives are relatively thin-bladed and designed for slicing, finely chopping and mincing vegetables, fish and boneless meats.  Heavier gǔdāo ("bone knife") are produced and are used much like Western-type meat cleavers to prepare large sides of beef, pork and other boned meats.  However, Chinese-style knives of this weight are not common in the West.

Caidao or so-called 'Chinese cleaver' is not a cleaver, and most manufacturers warn that it should not be used as a cleaver. It is more properly referred to as a Chinese chef's knife and is actually a general-purpose knife, analogous to the French chef's knife or the Japanese santoku. The confusion arises from the fact that Chinese chef's knives are rectangular and that some (particularly older, traditional knives made of carbon steel) have somewhat heavy blades. Also, the fact that the blade is heavier toward the tip encourages skilled Chinese chefs to use a swinging or "tapping" stroke as well as a "pushing" stroke. However, the edge has the gradual bevel of a chef's knife and will most probably be damaged if used for splitting bone. Actual cleavers in China have the same profile as chef's knives but have much thicker blades with a sharp bevel and heavier handles.

Modern Chinese knives are sold under three general classifications throughout China: Caidao (slicers), choppers and Gudao (cleavers). The general distinction lies in the thickness of the blade.  Choppers are the most common all-purpose Chinese knife. Choppers have thicker blades than slicers but are not as thick and heavy as cleavers. Choppers are used for slicing, chopping and mincing meat, vegetables and herbs. Choppers are suitable for chopping through thin soft bones such as fish and poultry.  Slicers, referred to as Caidao (vegetable knives) by the Chinese have the thinnest and sharpest blades. Slicers may have the same shape as choppers or they may have less width and appear similar to Japanese Nakiri knives. Slicers are used for cutting vegetables, mincing herbs and slicing thin strips of meat for stir frying. The thin blade makes slicers unsuitable for chopping any bones. Cleavers, which are referred to as bone choppers by the Chinese have thick heavy blades. In Chinese homes, cleavers are typically used for chopping up pork ribs or for preparing hard-shelled seafood such as lobsters.

The average Chinese home uses some variation of the rectangular-bladed knife, usually around 18 cm to 28 cm (7–11 inches) in length. Traditional knives had a simply-forged, carbon steel blade with a long, ground bevel, but the typical Chinese chef's knife is now a stamped blade. The traditional handle is a full-length tang that is only about 1 or 2 cm wide, which is passed through a metal cap, then through the center of a round, wood dowel, then bent over and hammered into the end of the handle to retain it. Newer models, particularly those made in Japan or Germany, have full-width tangs and riveted or injection-molded handles, but these handles generally retain something of the traditional, round cross-section. The wide blade of Caidao keeps the cook's fingers well off the cutting surface and the round handle gives a nice "pivot point" for the cutting stroke. The blade has a curvature or rocker along its edge that is generally uniform, improving the knife's ability to chop and mince meats and vegetables. The broad rectangular blade also serves to scoop up chopped food for transport to the wok or bowl. Although it may seem unwieldy, skilled practitioners worldwide may be observed using this style of knife for everything—even carving and fine work normally accomplished with a paring knife.

Small knives

Peeling or tourné knife 

Also known as a bird's beak knife, a peeling knife has a pointed tip that curves downward (sometimes upward) and from side to side (towards the blade). It can be used to cut decorative garnishes (such as rosettes or fluted mushrooms), slice soft fruits, or to remove skins and blemishes. It is also used to make a cut known as a tourné cut in vegetables such as carrots. It is a specialized type of paring knife.

Decorating

A decorating knife is any knife with a blade designed to make a decorative cut. The most common pattern is a simple zigzag. Decorating knives are used for making fancy cuts for garnishes and presentation.

Trimming
Usually about 5 cm to 8 cm (2 to 3 inches) long, a trimming knife has a small, curved blade that is shaped somewhat like a boning knife. Trimming knives are ideal for small tasks such as decorating and peeling.

Fluting
Usually about 5 cm to 10 cm (2 to 4 inches) long, a fluting knife has a small blade that is very straight. Fluting knives are ideal for small tasks such as decorating and peeling.

Specialty knives 

Certain knives are specialized for a particular food. For example, oyster knives are necessary to shuck oysters (which cannot safely be opened otherwise), but are not used outside of shellfish.

Tomato

A tomato knife is a small knife with a serrated blade. Typically about the size of a utility knife, tomato knives are ideal for cutting through the tough skin and soft flesh of tomatoes.

Oyster

An oyster knife has a short, thick blade that is used to pry open oysters and separate their meat from the shell (shucking). Some models have a shield built into the handle that prevents the knife (and hand) from slipping and going too far into the shell. The handle is normally thick and short, with a bulbous end.

Some notable styles include:

 French: This has a straight, thin blade suited to Ostrea edulis, a common oyster in France.
 Providence: This type is long and narrow.
 New Haven: The blade is fairly wide and blunt. The tip is angled upward.

Deveiner
A deveiner or deveining knife is a small knife used to remove the colon ("vein") from the back of shrimp.

Grapefruit

A grapefruit knife has a long, fat, dull blade that is used to separate the flesh of a grapefruit from the peel and inner membranes. The blade is usually serrated, with a blunt tip. Some knives even have a different blade style on each end of the handle – one for the inner membrane, one for the peel – and some have a double blade at the inner membrane end, to cut on both sides of the membrane.

Chestnut
A chestnut knife is used to score a chestnut with an "X" cut prior to roasting, so that steam does not build up inside and cause the nut to explode. They have very shallow blades so that they can cut through the shell without cutting through the nut inside.

Other knives

Mincing

Also known as a mezzaluna (Italian: "half moon") because of the shape, a mincing knife is a semicircular highly curved blade with a handle that allows the blade to be rocked back and forth repeatedly on a hard surface. This rocking motion is ideal for mincing and chopping. Some mincing knives are supplied with a wooden cutting board with a circular bowl-shaped indentation that matches the curvature of the knife. Some models have two blades that are parallel to each other to increase their mincing power.

Large mezzaluna-like knives with shallow curves are sometimes used to cut pizza, though the rolling pizza cutter is more common for this purpose.

Accessories

Cutting board

A cutting board is kitchen utensil used in conjunction with a knife. It is a flat surface, generally made of either wood, plastic or glass (glass are less common because they dull the blade; used more for decoration), on which to cut food and which protects counter tops and knives from damage.

Carving fork

A carving fork is a long, two-pronged fork used to hold meat steady while it is being carved. Carving forks are often sold together with carving knives or slicers as part of a matched carving set.

Honing steel

Contrary to popular belief, a honing steel (or butcher's steel or sharpening steel) does not sharpen knives, but instead straightens the blade, while a sharpener sharpens the blade. It is used to hone a knife blade after sharpening in order to restore the edge and improve cutting ability.

Shears

Kitchen scissors or shears can be used for many of the same jobs as knives, such as chopping herbs.

Knife block

A knife block is a common way to store knives safely and close at hand in the kitchen. This is an angled block of wood, steel, or other material, with slots for inserting knife blades, and sometimes other accessories, like kitchen scissors.

Cut-resistant gloves

Most commonly used in commercial kitchens, cut-resistant gloves (also referred to as cutting gloves) are used on the opposite hand to the cutting hand. They are for protecting this hand should the knife slip and slice into the user's off hand. They are typically made of kevlar or metal mesh. Other uses for cutting gloves in kitchens include using or cleaning meat/cheese slicers, hand mixing very hot or cold food items, and cleaning or using any type of sharp bladed machine.

See also
 Carbon steel
 Cooking
 Japanese kitchen knife
 Table knife
 Tool
 Tool use by primates

References

Inline citations

General and cited sources 

 
 
 Lee, Matt and Lee, Ted (December 15, 2004). When a Knife Is the Gleam in a Cook's Eye. New York Times.
 Cooking For Engineers – Examination of Parts of a Chef's Knife and what to look for when buying a kitchen knife
 "How to Succeed at Knife-Sharpening Without Losing a Thumb", The New York Times, September 23, 2006

External links 

 Cooking For Engineers - Kitchen Knives – explains common kitchen knives
 

 

sv:Kökskniv